Andreas Bohnenstengel (born 9 June 1970) is a German photographer who lives and works in Munich.

Biography
Bohnenstengel began in 1991 as a press photographer for the regional daily newspaper Münchner Merkur. Subsequently, he worked for magazines like Der Spiegel, Stern, and others, as well as the Rolf Müller office for visual communication. Since 2004 he has taught photography for example at Schule für Gestaltung in Ravensburg. In his conceptual works, he discusses the phenomenae of society. Works by Bohnenstengel are held in the permanent collection of the Deutsches Historisches Museum in Berlin.

Awards
 1995: Medienpreis für Sozialfotografie
 1996: Kodak European Gold Award
 1997: Die 100 besten Plakate des Jahres 1997. Poster: Glückskinder
 1999: Auszeichnung Deutsche Städtemedien, Kulturplakat des Monats
 2001: Nikon Photo Contest International

Exhibitions

 Summer 2022: Very nice that you exist contribution to the glockenbach biennial with the motto different = normal
 Summer 2020: The time before Corona – reminder marker, public space munich, continued with the series: The Expectation
 February 2019 – May 2019: Der Wasserburger Taubenmarkt, Photo installation in the 
 November 2018 – January 2019: Kinderleicht – Jugendfußball, at the city hall Krailling
 July 2017: Der Pferdemarkt München - Pictures from a previous world. Solo Exhibition at the Sendlinger Kulturschmiede, Munich
 July 2017: Kunst im Viehhof - poster competition. Awards for the poster „Feste feiern wie sie fallen“
 June 2015: Von Rössern, Reitern und Händlern: Der Roßmarkt damals. Photo installation Viehhof, Munich
 March 2015: Kriegsenkel. Solo exhibition at Spirituelles Zentrum St. Martin, Munich
 January 2008: Treffpunkt Leben. Jung und Alt im Austausch. (Supporting a class of design students of the sfg-Ravensburg as a lecturer) Exhibition and book. Seniorenzentrum St. Vinzenz, Wangen im Allgäu
 November 2014: Kein Ort, nirgends?. Solo exhibition at the Tagungshaus Helmstedt at the conference of Kriegsenkel e.V.
 August 2005: 24 Stunden im Leben der katholischen Kirche, Exhibition at World Youth Day in Cologne
 July 2003: Menschen mit Down-Syndrom begegnen. Solo exhibition at the Bayerischen Sozialministerium, part of the European year of disabled persons
 May 2003: Habe Hunger und kein Bett. Participation in an art and social project on homelessness, Pasinger Fabrik, Munich
 October 2002: Augenblicke. Solo exhibition in the Galerie der Gegenfüßler der IG Medien in ver.di Bayern, Munich
 October 2002: Menschen mit Down-Syndrom begegnen. Solo exhibition at the  Zentrum für natürliche Geburt, Munich. Start of Touring exhibition
 June 2002: Photo installation Augenblicke, Regensburg and other locations
 December 2001: Brauchtumspflege in Bayern: Gaupreisplatteln. Exhibition participation and award Pressefoto Bayern 2001, Maximilianeum Munich
 October 2001: Exhibition participation at the 4. Schömberger Fotoherbst - Festival für klassische Reise - und Reportagefotografie, Schömberg (Schwarzwald)
 October 2001: ALTerLEBEN. Solo exhibition about older People with disabilities, for 30th anniversary of Vereinigung für Jugendhilfe Berlin e.V.
 February 2001: Werkschau. Slide projection at Kunstpark Ost, Munich
 June 2000: Es ist normal Verschieden zu sein. Touring exhibition 40 years of Lebenshilfe, Munich and other locations
 December 1999: Der fremde Blick. Solo exhibition on transcultural encounters, culture centre Unna
 October 1999: Ich bin anders als du denkst. Solo exhibition about young people with Down-Syndrom, Pasinger Fabrik, Munich. Touring exhibition with 30 locations
 October 1998: Exhibition participation at the 1. Schömberger Fotoherbst - Festival für klassische Reise - und Reportagefotografie, Schömberg (Schwarzwald)
 November 1997: Glückskinder. Solo exhibition Seidlvilla, Munich
 September 1997: Alt und Jung. "Old and Young" - Exhibition participation and first prize, Aspekte Galerie Gasteig, Munich
 December 1993: Willkommen im Würmtal. Solo exhibition about asylum seekers, Gräfelfing
 September 1993: Flüchtingscontainer.  Exhibition at „Fremde Heimat München“ culture festival with a series on life in a shelter, Munich
 August 1993: Eine Bühne für das Alter. Solo exhibition about elderly people, retirement home Maria Eich Krailling
 July 1993: Gewalt: In der Welt habt ihr Angst. Solo exhibition about asylum seekers at the 25. German Evangelical Church Assembly, Munich

Gallery

References

External links

 
 

1970 births
Living people
Photographers from Munich
German contemporary artists